Minor Jesser Coon (July 29, 1921 – September 5, 2018) was an American biochemist and Victor V Vaughan Distinguished University Professor Emeritus at the University of Michigan, Ann Arbor. He is best known for his research on cytochrome P-450 and as the co-discoverer of HMG-CoA, along with Bimal Kumar Bachhawat. He died on September 5, 2018 from complications due to Alzheimer's disease.

Early life and education
Coon was born in Englewood, Colorado in 1921. He was an undergraduate student at the University of Colorado and received his bachelor's degree with honors in 1943. He received his Ph.D. from the University of Illinois at Urbana–Champaign in 1946, supervised by William Cumming Rose. During his graduate work he studied amino acid metabolism and nitrogen balance using himself and his fellow students as volunteer subjects.

Academic career
After a year as a postdoctoral fellow at the University of Illinois, Coon became a faculty member at the University of Pennsylvania in 1947. He moved to the University of Michigan Medical School in 1955 and remained there for the remainder of his career, chairing the biological chemistry department from 1970 to 1990 and becoming the Victor V. Vaughan Distinguished University Professor of Biological Chemistry in 1983. Coon served as the president of the American Society for Biochemistry and Molecular Biology from 1991 to 1992. He became a member of the United States National Academy of Sciences in 1983 and a fellow of the American Academy of Arts and Sciences in 1984. A biological chemistry professorship in his honor was established at the University of Michigan in 1991.

Coon mentored many graduate students and promoted teaching along with research, including David Ballou and Professor Emeritus Tetsufumi Ueda, a pioneer in neuroscience. The Minor J. and Mary Lou Coon Award was established by him and his wife, to recognize an outstanding graduate student in biological chemistry at the University of Michigan who excels at teaching, research, and service.

Interests
Coon was a patron of the arts.

Awards and honors
Coon has received a number of awards in recognition of his scientific achievements.
 Paul-Lewis Award in Enzyme Chemistry, 1959
 William C. Rose Award in Biochemistry, 1978
 Bernard B. Brodie Award in Drug Metabolism, 1980
 Member, United States National Academy of Sciences, 1983
 Fellow, American Academy of Arts and Sciences, 1984
 Member, Institute of Medicine, 1987
Honorary Doctor of Medicine, Karolinska Institute

References

1921 births
2018 deaths
University of Michigan faculty
Members of the United States National Academy of Sciences
Fellows of the American Academy of Arts and Sciences
Members of the National Academy of Medicine
Deaths from Alzheimer's disease
Deaths from dementia in Michigan
University of Colorado alumni
University of Illinois Urbana-Champaign alumni
People from Englewood, Colorado
20th-century American biochemists